Since its independence, Armenia has maintained a policy of complementarism by trying to have positive and friendly relations with Iran, Russia, and the West, including the United States and the European Union. It has full membership status in a number of international organizations and observer status, etc. in some others. However, the dispute over the Armenian genocide of 1915 and the ongoing Nagorno-Karabakh conflict have created tense relations with two of its immediate neighbors, Azerbaijan and Turkey.

The Ministry of Foreign Affairs implements the foreign policy agenda of the Government of Armenia and organizes and manages diplomatic services abroad. Since August 2021, Ararat Mirzoyan serves as the Minister of Foreign Affairs of Armenia.

Foreign relations
Armenia is a member of more than 70 different international organizations, including the following:
 
 Asian Development Bank	
 Collective Security Treaty Organization and the Commonwealth of Independent States 
 Council of Europe 
 The EU's Eastern Partnership and the Euronest Parliamentary Assembly 
 The UN's Eastern European Group
 Eurocontrol
 European Bank for Reconstruction and Development
 European Political Community
 Eurasian Economic Union	
 Eurasian Development Bank and the Eurasian Customs Union	
 Federation of Euro-Asian Stock Exchanges	
 International Bank for Reconstruction and Development
 International Monetary Fund
 Interpol
 La Francophonie	
 NATO's Euro-Atlantic Partnership Council, Individual Partnership Action Plan, and Partnership for Peace
 Organization for Security and Cooperation in Europe
 Organization of the Black Sea Economic Cooperation
 TRACECA
 United Nations		
 World Bank, the World Customs Organization, and the World Trade Organization

Armenia is also an observer member of the Community of Democratic Choice, the Non-Aligned Movement, the Organization of American States, the Pacific Alliance, the Arab League, the Community of Democracies, a dialogue partner in the Shanghai Cooperation Organisation, and a regional member of the Asian Infrastructure Investment Bank.

Armenian genocide recognition

As of 2023, 34 states have officially recognized the historical events as genocide. Parliaments of countries that recognize the Armenian genocide include Argentina, Armenia, Austria, Belgium, Bolivia, Brazil, Bulgaria, Canada, Chile, Cyprus, Czech Republic, France, Germany, Greece, Italy, Latvia, Lebanon, Libya, Lithuania, Luxembourg, Mexico, the Netherlands, Paraguay, Poland, Portugal, Russia, Slovakia, Sweden, Switzerland, Syria, United States, Uruguay, Vatican City and Venezuela. Additionally, some regional governments of countries recognize the Armenian genocide too, such as New South Wales and South Australia in Australia as well as Scotland, Northern Ireland and Wales in the United Kingdom. US House Resolution 106 was introduced on 30 January 2007, and later referred to the House Committee on Foreign Affairs. The bill has 225 co-sponsors. The bill called for former President George W. Bush to recognize and use the word genocide in his annual 24 April speech which he never used. His successor President Barack Obama expressed his desire to recognize the Armenian genocide during the electoral campaigns, but after being elected, did not use the word "genocide" to describe the events that occurred in 1915. The US House of Representatives formally recognized the Armenian genocide with House Resolution 296 on 29 October 2019. The United States Senate unanimously recognized the genocide with Senate Resolution 150 on 12 December 2019. In 2021, President Joe Biden became the first U.S. president to formally recognize the Armenian genocide. As of 2022, all 50 U.S. states have also recognized the events as genocide.

Disputes

Nagorno-Karabakh conflict 

Armenia provides political, material and military support to the Republic of Artsakh in the longstanding Nagorno-Karabakh conflict.

The current conflict over Nagorno-Karabakh began in 1988 when Armenian demonstrations against Azerbaijani rule broke out in Nagorno–Karabakh and later in Armenia. The Nagorno-Karabakh Autonomous Oblast voted to secede from Azerbaijan and join Armenia. Soon, violence broke out against Armenians in Azerbaijan and Azeris in Armenia. In 1990, after violent episodes in Nagorno–Karabakh and Azerbaijani cities like Baku, Sumgait and Kirovabad, Moscow declared a state of emergency in Karabakh, sending troops to the region, and forcibly occupied Baku, killing over a hundred civilians. In April 1991, Azerbaijani militia and Soviet forces targeted Armenian populations in Karabakh, known as Operation Ring. Moscow also deployed troops to Yerevan. Following the collapse of the Soviet Union, conflict escalated into a full-scale war between the Nagorno-Karabakh Republic (supported by Armenia), and Azerbaijan. Military action was influenced by the Russian military, which manipulated the rivalry between the two neighbouring sides in order to keep both under control.

More than 30,000 people were killed in the fighting during the period of 1988 to 1994. In May 1992, Armenian forces seized Shusha and Lachin (thereby linking Nagorno-Karabakh to Armenia). By October 1993, Armenian forces succeeded in taking almost all of former NKAO, Lachin and large areas in southwestern Azerbaijan. In 1993, the UN Security Council adopted four resolutions calling for the cessation of hostilities, unimpeded access for international humanitarian relief efforts, and the eventual deployment of a peacekeeping force in the region. Fighting continued, however, until May 1994 at which time Russia brokered a cease-fire between the three sides.

Negotiations to resolve the conflict peacefully have been ongoing since 1992 under the Minsk Group of the Organization for Security and Co-operation in Europe. The Minsk Group is co-chaired by Russia, France, and the United States and has representation from Turkey, the U.S., several European nations, Armenia and Azerbaijan. Despite the 1994 cease-fire, sporadic violations, sniper-fire and land mine incidents continue to claim over 100 lives each year.

Since 1997, the Minsk Group co-chairs have presented three proposals to serve as a framework for resolving the conflict. Each proposal was rejected. Beginning in 1999, the presidents of Azerbaijan and Armenia initiated a direct dialogue through a series of face-to-face meetings, often facilitated by the Minsk Group Co-Chairs. The OSCE sponsored a round of negotiations between the presidents in Key West, Florida. U.S. Secretary of State Colin Powell launched the talks on 3 April 2001, and the negotiations continued with mediation by the U.S., Russia and France until 6 April 2001. The Co-Chairs are still continuing to work with the two presidents in the hope of finding lasting peace.

The two countries are still at war. Citizens of Armenia, as well as citizens of any other country who are of Armenian descent, are forbidden entry to Azerbaijan. If a person's passport shows evidence of travel to Nagorno–Karabakh, they are forbidden entry to Azerbaijan.

In 2008, in what became known as the 2008 Mardakert Skirmishes, Armenian forces and Azerbaijan clashed over Nagorno-Karabakh. The fighting between the sides was brief, with few casualties on either side.

The 2020 Nagorno-Karabakh war was the latest escalation of the unresolved conflict.

Countries without diplomatic relations
Armenia does not have diplomatic relations with the following countries (organized by continent):

Africa 
 Botswana, Lesotho, São Tomé and Príncipe, South Sudan

The Americas 
 Barbados, Trinidad and Tobago

Asia 
 Azerbaijan, Pakistan (Pakistan is the only country in the world that does not recognize Armenia), Saudi Arabia, Turkey, Yemen

Oceania 
 Marshall Islands, Papua New Guinea, Samoa, Solomon Islands, Tonga

Armenia also has no diplomatic relations with states with limited recognition except for the Republic of Artsakh.

Countries with diplomatic relations

Armenia has diplomatic relations with 179 separate entities (including the African Union, Arab League, European Union, the Order of Malta, and Vatican City). These include: Afghanistan, Albania, Algeria, Andorra, Angola, Antigua and Barbuda, Argentina, Australia, Austria, Bahamas, Bahrain, Bangladesh, Belarus, Belgium, Belize, Benin, Bhutan, Bolivia, Brazil, Brunei Darussalam, Bulgaria, Burkina Faso, Burundi, Cambodia, Cameroon, Canada, Cape Verde, Central African Republic, Chad, Chile, the People's Republic of China, Colombia, Comoros, Costa Rica, Côte d'Ivoire, Croatia, Cuba, Cyprus, Czech Republic, Denmark, Djibouti, Dominica, Dominican Republic, DR Congo, East Timor, Ecuador, Egypt, El Salvador, Equatorial Guinea, Eritrea, Estonia, Eswatini, Ethiopia, Fiji, Finland, France, Gabon, The Gambia, Georgia, Germany, Ghana, Greece, Grenada, Guatemala, Guinea, Guinea-Bissau, Haiti, Holy See (Vatican City), Honduras, Hungary, Iceland, India, Indonesia, Iran, Iraq, Ireland, Israel, Italy, Jamaica, Japan, Jordan, Kazakhstan, Kenya, Kiribati, North Korea, South Korea, Kuwait, Kyrgyzstan, Laos, Latvia, Lebanon, Liberia, Libya, Liechtenstein, Lithuania, Luxembourg, Madagascar, Malawi, Malaysia, Maldives, Mali, Malta, Mauritania, Mexico, Micronesia, Moldova, Monaco, Mongolia, Montenegro, Morocco, Mozambique, Myanmar, Namibia, Nauru, Nepal, Netherlands, New Zealand, Nicaragua, Niger, Nigeria, North Macedonia, Norway, Oman, Palau, Panama, Paraguay, Peru, Philippines, Poland, Portugal, Qatar, Romania, Russia, Rwanda, Saint Kitts and Nevis, Saint Lucia, Saint Vincent and the Grenadines, San Marino, Senegal, Serbia, Seychelles, Sierra Leone, Singapore, Slovakia, Slovenia, Somalia, South Africa, Spain, Sri Lanka, Sudan, Suriname, Sweden, Switzerland, Syria, Tajikistan, Tanzania, Thailand, Togo, Tunisia, Turkmenistan, Tuvalu, Uganda, Ukraine, the United Arab Emirates, the United Kingdom, the United States of America, Uruguay, Vanuatu, Venezuela, Vietnam, Zambia and Zimbabwe.

Notes on some of these relations follow (organized by continent):

Africa

The Americas

Asia

Europe

Oceania

Other international organizations
Armenia is additionally a full member, unless otherwise noted, in the following international organizations, programs and treaties:

See also

 Armenia and the United Nations
 Armenia–BSEC relations
 Armenia in the Council of Europe
 Armenia–NATO relations
 Armenia–OSCE relations
 Armenian diaspora
 Euronest Parliamentary Assembly
 Foreign relations of Artsakh
 Largest Armenian diaspora communities
 List of ambassadors of Armenia
 List of diplomatic missions in Armenia
 List of diplomatic missions of Armenia
 List of Ministers of Foreign Affairs of Armenia
 Politics of Europe
 Visa policy of Armenia
 Visa requirements for Armenian citizens

Footnotes

References

External links

 Argentina
 List of Treaties ruling the relations Argentina and Armenia (Argentine Foreign Ministry, in Spanish)
 Canada
 Armenian embassy in Ottawa
 Canadian Ministry of Foreign Affairs and International Trade about relations with Armenian
Chile
 
 Chilean Senate: recognition of the Armenian genocide (in Spanish only) 
 Czech
 Armenian embassy in London
 British Foreign and Commonwealth Office about relations with Armenia *British embassy in Yerevan
Denmark
 Danish Foreign Ministry: development program with Armenia
NATO
 Iskandaryan, Alexander:"NATO and Armenia: A Long Game of Complementarism" in the Caucasus Analytical Digest No. 5
International
 Khachatrian, Haroutiun: "Foreign Investments in Armenia: Influence of the Crisis and Other Peculiarities" in the Caucasus Analytical Digest No. 28